"Almost Hear You Sigh" is a Grammy-nominated song by The Rolling Stones from their 1989 album Steel Wheels, written by Mick Jagger, Keith Richards, and Steve Jordan. The song was originally a contender for inclusion on Richards' first solo album, Talk Is Cheap, but he decided to play it for Jagger and Chris Kimsey the next year during recording sessions in Montserrat for the Steel Wheels album. With the exception of some lyrical alteration by Jagger, the composition was left in its original form. The single, which was released in January 1990 and was the third single released from Steel Wheels, reached No. 50 on the Billboard Hot 100 (US), reaching the slightly higher position of 31 in the UK, and placed No. 1 on the US Mainstream Rock Tracks chart for one week.

Release and reception 
Released as the album's third single in January 1990, "Almost Hear You Sigh" made it to No. 50 on the Billboard Hot 100 in the US, going slightly higher in the UK, and No. 1 for one week on the US Mainstream Rock Tracks chart. Given that the Rolling Stones' comeback 1989 North American tour had finished in December, the song got limited radio airplay. A music video was shot in black and white during the band's 1989 visit to Toronto, for two shows at the Skydome.

USA Today music critic Edna Gundersen noted that Jagger's vocals and Richards' guitar playing sounded best on slower Steel Wheels tracks such as "Almost Hear You Sigh." SF Weekly marks it as one of the Stones' best ballads recorded after 1971. However, Parry Gettelman of the Orlando Sentinel marked the track's Grammy nomination as that of a relatively uninspiring song.

The song has been performed only on the Urban Jungle Tour leg of the Steel Wheels/Urban Jungle Tour. Since its release, the song has been performed 7 times on the 1989 tour, and on all shows of the 1990 tour.

Charts

References 

1990 singles
The Rolling Stones songs
1990 songs
Songs written by Jagger–Richards
Music videos directed by Wayne Isham
Song recordings produced by Jagger–Richards
Song recordings produced by Chris Kimsey